The Ministry of Information Technology is a ministry of the Government of Maharashtra. It is responsible for preparing annual plans for the development of Maharashtra state.

The Ministry is headed by a cabinet level Minister. Eknath Shinde is Current Minister of Information Technology. As a Chief Minister of Maharashtra.

Head office

List of Cabinet Ministers

List of Ministers of State

References

Government ministries of Maharashtra